Dysgonia dulcis is a moth of the family Noctuidae first described by Arthur Gardiner Butler in 1878. It is found in Korea, China, Japan (Honshu, Shikoku, Kyushu), the Russian Far East (the Primorye region) and Taiwan.

References

Dysgonia
Insects of Korea